Hallelujah is a 7-track EP by Madchester band Happy Mondays, released in the US and Australia in 1989 and featuring a number of remixes by Paul Oakenfold. "Hallelujah (MacColl Mix)" was created by Steve Lillywhite and features Kirsty MacColl. Oakenfold remixed "Hallelujah" with Andrew Weatherall and "Rave On" with Terry Farley. The club mix of "Hallelujah" was ranked at number 11 in NME's list of "The 50 Best Remixes Ever".

Track listing 
"Hallelujah" (MacColl Mix) – 2:39
"Clap Your Hands" – 3:28
"Holy Ghost" – 2:50
"Rave On" – 6:10
"Hallelujah" (Club Mix) – 6:27
"Rave On" (Club Mix) – 5:38
"W.F.L." (Think About The Future Mix) – 7:10

The Australian release inserts an additional track, "He's Gonna Step On You Again – Step On" (Stuff It In Mix) – 5:54, after "Rave On".

References

Happy Mondays albums
1989 EPs
Albums produced by Martin Hannett
1989 remix albums
Remix EPs
Factory Records remix albums
Factory Records EPs
Factory Records singles

th:Hallelujah